The final tournament of UEFA Euro 1968 was a single-elimination tournament involving the four teams that qualified from the quarter-finals. There were two rounds of matches: a semi-final stage leading to the final to decide the champions. The final tournament began with the semi-finals on 5 June and ended with the final replay on 10 June at the Stadio Olimpico in Rome. Italy won the tournament with a 2–0 replay victory over Yugoslavia.

All times Central European Summer Time (UTC+2).

Format
Any game in the final tournament that was undecided by the end of the regular 90 minutes was followed by thirty minutes of extra time (two 15-minute halves). If scores were still level, a coin toss would be used in all matches but the final. If the final finished level after extra time, a replay would take place at a later date to decide the winner.

Teams

Bracket

Semi-finals

Italy vs Soviet Union
The match was decided by a coin toss. Italy captain Giacinto Facchetti called correctly.

Yugoslavia vs England

Third place play-off

Final

Original match
As the match ended in a draw, a replay was played to determine the winner.

Replay

References

External links

 UEFA Euro 1968 at UEFA.com

Knockout stage
1968
Knockout stage
Knockout stage
Knockout stage
Knockout stage
1960s in Rome
20th century in Naples
Sports competitions in Florence
Sports competitions in Naples
Sports competitions in Rome